= Jan van Veen (footballer) =

Dutch footballer

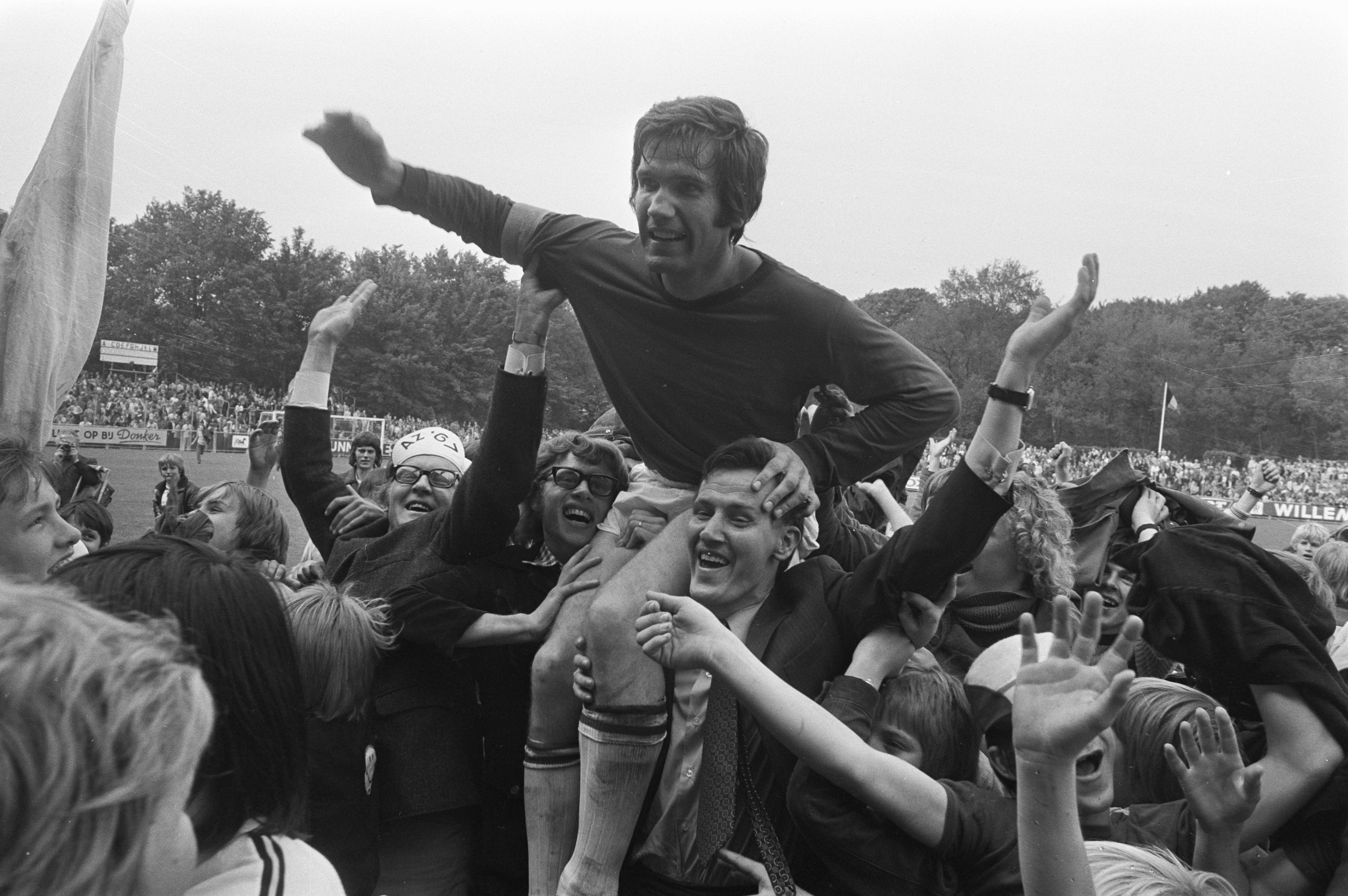
- Van Veen (on the shoulders) after the 1972 victory

Personal information
- Full name: Johannes Hendricus van Veen
- Date of birth: 15 December 1942 (age 83)
- Place of birth: Amsterdam, the Netherlands
- Height: 1.84 m (6 ft 0 in)
- Position: Defender

Youth career
- -1962: AFC Ajax (under-19)

Senior career*
Years	Team	Apps	(Gls)
1962–1964	AFC Ajax		
1964–1967	FC Zaanstreek	17	(1)
1967-1972	AZ Alkmaar	171	(9)
- * Club domestic league appearances and goals

Johannes Hendricus "Jan" van Veen (born 15 December 1942) is a Dutch former footballer who played as a defender.

Born in Amsterdam he played with the under-19 team of AFC Ajax and moved in 1964 to the senior team. In 1964 he was bought by FC Zaanstreek for f1000. In 1967 the team defunct and merged into AZ Alkmaar where he became captain of the team. He played for the team a total of 171 matches, including 97 Eredivisie matches.
